Giacomo Olzer (born 14 April 2001) is an Italian professional football player who plays for Serie B club Brescia.

Club career 
Giacomo Olzer made his professional debut for AC Milan on the 12 January 2021 in the Coppa Italia round of 16 match against Torino.

On 9 July 2021, Milan announced that they had reached an agreement with Brescia for the transfer of Olzer on a deal worth €16 million, plus a maximum of €3 million in bonuses, with Milan keeping buy back option on Olzer. The deal was also coordinated with a swap of Sandro Tonali, who went the other direction.

Career statistics

References

External links

2001 births
Living people
Italian footballers
Italy youth international footballers
Association football midfielders
People from Rovereto
A.C. Milan players
Brescia Calcio players
Serie B players
Sportspeople from Trentino
Footballers from Trentino-Alto Adige/Südtirol